David Hoenigman (born and raised in Cleveland, Ohio) is an author of experimental literature and avant-garde literature.

He has lived in Tokyo, Japan since 1998.

Burn Your Belongings
Hoenigman's novel, Burn Your Belongings, has been described by The Japan Times as "a brave exercise in anti-narrative, a reminder to us that there is more to writing and reading than best-sellers."

Word Riot compared the novel to the work of Samuel Beckett and Pierre Guyotat, summarizing the novel as "a well-crafted and adventurous book from what is undoubtedly a writer of great promise."

The Stranger writes "David Hoenigman's Burn Your Belongings is a dense narrative of choppy sentences that elude the human desire for story at almost every turn. When read aloud, mantralike, the thick walls of text take on the feel of religious chant, a prayer to weariness and sickness and anxiety. At other times, they flutter with moments of happiness and love, and feel exponentially more like real life than anything Hemingway or any naturalist ever put to paper."

Bibliography
Novels

 Burn Your Belongings, Jaded Ibis Press (2010)
 Squeal for Joy, Schism 2 Books (2015)

Novellas

 Man Sees Demon, SFC Indie Press (2020)

Chapbooks

 Shame on You, Louffa Press (2010)

Film Appearances

Hoenigman appeared as a giant in the film Attack on Titan (2015).

Interviews
Hoenigman regularly interviewed avant-garde writers for the online journal Word Riot. Some of the writers he has interviewed for Word Riot include Mark Amerika, John Bennett, Norbert Blei, Tom Bradley, James Chapman, Billy Childish, Noah Cicero, Dennis Cooper, Debra Di Blasi, Shozin Fukui, Eckhard Gerdes, Richard Gilbert, Richard Kostelanetz, Stacey Levine, Jeffrey Lewis, Carole Maso, Scott McClanahan, Dawn Raffel, Davis Schneiderman, Jess C Scott, Ron Silliman, Judith Skillman, Terese Svoboda, and D. Harlan Wilson.

Hoenigman's Sion Sono article was the cover story of the June 19, 2009 edition of Metropolis Magazine.

In November 2009, Hoenigman's interview with Yoko Ono appeared in The Japan Times.

Hoenigman also interviewed Japanese film director and screenwriter, Kōji Shiraishi for 3:AM Magazine.

In 2020, Hoenigman started the Blown Speakers Vlog: "A Program for Mass Liberation in the Form of an Album Discussion Vlog."

References

Living people
21st-century American novelists
American male novelists
Postmodernists
Writers from Cleveland
21st-century American male writers
Novelists from Ohio
Year of birth missing (living people)